Zamindar is a 1966 Indian Telugu-language action thriller film directed by V. Madhusudhana Rao. It stars Akkineni Nageswara Rao and Krishna Kumari, with music composed by T. Chalapathi Rao. It was produced by Tammareddy Krishna Murthy under the Ravindra Art Pictures banner. The film is loosely based on the 1963  English film Charade.

Plot 
Saroja (Krishna Kumari) and her friends go for a picnic and confront the hero, Seshagiri (Akkineni Nageswara Rao) and his friends for accommodation in a guest house and tease each other. Saroja is the daughter of a rich man, Narahari (Mudigonda Lingamurthy) and Seshagiri is the pampered brother of Subbarao (Gummadi) and his wife Lakshmi (Hemalatha). Seshagiri and Saroja fall in love.

The story takes a sharp turn with the entrance of the villain, Raju (Nagabhushanam). Narahari is worried at his arrival
because of the dark past between them.

Six friends, Narahari, Raju, Joginder, Johnny, Murthy and Kumar worked in the military during the Second World War. Narahari was entrusted with the job of transporting 25 lakhs of money to a certain place by the Army. He was accompanied by the rest. All the friends decide to grab the money. They hide the money and inform their superiors that the money was seized by the enemies.

After the war, the friends decide to share the stolen amount. Joginder was discharged early from duty. Hence he was entrusted with the job of safeguarding the money. However, Joginder was arrested by the Police in Kolkata for a different reason. Narahari is left with a box belonging to Joginder, which contained clothes and an old watch.

Raju persistently asks Narahari about the stolen money of 25 Lakhs taken from Joginder. However, Narahari is totally ignorant about this money. Raju threatens Narahari and takes a half share from his property and kills him. Saroja mistakes Seshagiri as the murderer. Meanwhile, Johnny (Satyanarayana), Murthy (Nellore Kantha Rao) and Kumar come to Narahari's house for the money. Raju tells them that he is also in search of the same. Raju cleverly kills Kumar and Johnny. Meanwhile, Joginder comes to Narahari's house and tells the others that the money is converted into diamonds and hidden in the old watch. Murthy tries to run for the watch and is killed by Joginder. Finally, Raju is killed in a gunfight with the Seshagiri, before which he confesses his crimes in the presence of Saroja. Saroja repents for mistaking Seshagiri.

It is finally revealed that Seshagiri is an undercover police officer. The stolen money is handed over to the Government.
Seshagiri and Saroja are married.

Cast 
 Akkineni Nageswara Rao as Seshagiri Rao "Seshu"
 Krishna Kumari as Saroja
 Gummadi as Subbarao
 Nagabhushanam as Raja Rao "Raju"
 Relangi as Hanumanthu
 Mudigonda Lingamurthy as Narahari
 Mikkilineni as Joginder
 Satyanarayana as Johnny
 Nellore Kanta Rao as Murthy
 Ch. Krishnamurthy as Raju's Assistant
 Suryakantham as Madam
 Hemalatha as Lakshmi
 L. Vijayalakshmi as Secretary Viji

Soundtrack 
Music composed by T. Chalapathi Rao.

References

External links 
 

1960s action thriller films
1960s Telugu-language films
1966 films
Films directed by V. Madhusudhana Rao
Films scored by T. Chalapathi Rao
Indian action thriller films
Indian black-and-white films